is a Japanese yuri manga written and illustrated by Eku Takeshima. It was first serialized in Ichijinsha's Comic Yuri Hime April 2019 issue and is licensed in English by Kodansha Comics. An anime television series adaptation by Cloud Hearts is set to premiere in January 2024.

Synopsis 
On the first day of entering high school, Himari Kino "falls" for her senior, Yori Asanagi, whom she watched singing with a band at the welcome party for new students. When Himari confesses her admiration to Yori, Yori misinterprets Himari's feelings as romantic love. However, before Yori realizes, she comes to fall for Himari anyway, and promises to win her affections for real.

Characters 

 A first-year high school student, an energetic girl who falls in love with Yori's singing on her first day of school. She confesses her admiration to Yori, who misinterprets her feelings as romantic. However, she agrees to spend time together to see if she can come to feel the same way as Yori.

 A third-year high school student, who serves as the vocalist and lead guitarist for the band SS Girls after their previous vocalist quit. Often seen as stoic by those around her, Yori enjoys singing while playing the guitar on the school's rooftop alone and collecting cute cat merchandise. Yori falls for Himari after her "confession", only to realize later that Himari was actually confessing admiration for her singing. However, she resolves to get Himari to reciprocate her feelings in time.

 A cheerful third-year student and the bassist for SS Girls. She is Yori's best friend and tries to support her in winning over Himari while hiding the fact she has romantic feelings for Yori herself.

 A stoic third-year student and the drummer for SS Girls. She comes from a rich background and is childhood friends with Kaori.

 An easygoing third-year student and the keyboardist for SS Girls. She has been friends with Kaori since childhood.

 Aki's younger sister and Himari's best friend since elementary school. She is part of the brass band club and tries to support Himari any way she can.

 A second-year and former vocalist and guitarist of SS Girls, which she left following a feud with Aki. She now fronts a rival band, Laureley, while also acting as a ghost member for the Culinary Research Club. 

 A kind-hearted second-year who is president of the Culinary Research Club and guitarist for Laureley. Gentle and supportive, she quickly befriends Himari, who joins her club.

 A second year student who is the drummer for Laureley. She is often seen with Momoka.

Media

Manga 
Written and illustrated by Eku Takeshima, Whisper Me a Love Song began serialization in Japan in the April 2019 issue of Ichijinsha's Comic Yuri Hime magazine, released on February 18, 2019. It has been compiled into seven tankōbon volumes as of January 18, 2023. Kodansha USA licensed the series in English and began releasing volumes in North America from October 2020.

Anime 
An anime television series adaptation was announced on January 13, 2023. The series will be produced by Cloud Hearts and directed by Xin Ya Cai, with Yokohama Animation Laboratory credited for supervision, Hiroki Uchida overseeing series' scripts, and Minami Yoshida designing the characters. It is set to premiere in January 2024.

Reception 
Erica Friedman of Yuricon noted in her review that while the story is not groundbreaking it is "so pleasant and full of such pleasant characters, that it's a joy to read." In contrast, The OASG criticizes its ability to keep the series interesting, "Eku Takeshima is betting the success of this entire story on the strength of the relationship between Himari and Yori and while that may have worked if this story was a short one-shot, it's not nearly enough for an entire series."

Rebecca Silverman of Anime News Network praised the characters and called it "a yuri series you don't want to miss." Nicki Bauman likewise praised the characters, calling them "delightfully passionate and excited by each other" but criticized the series's pacing. 

In 2020, Whisper Me a Love Song was nominated for Niconico and Da Vinci's Next Manga Awards, and placed eighteenth out of 50 nominees.

References

External links 
 Official Japanese manga website
 Official English manga website
 Official anime website 
 

2019 manga
2010s LGBT literature
Anime series based on manga
Cloud Hearts
Ichijinsha manga
School life in anime and manga
Slice of life anime and manga
Upcoming anime television series
Yuri (genre) anime and manga